Maer is a coastal hamlet in north Cornwall, England, United Kingdom.

The hamlet contains the only "known probable tithe barn" in Cornwall, which was extensively restored and modernised following a purchase in 2012. Its restoration, by architects The Bazeley Partnership, was featured on the Channel 4 programme Homes By the Sea.

The National Trust maintains Maer Down and Maer Cliff immediately west of the hamlet. The South West Coast Path runs along the clifftop past Maer.

References

Hamlets in Cornwall
Populated coastal places in Cornwall